Jacobin Yoma (born 6 October 1966) is a French Guianan former professional boxer who competed from 1989 to 1999, and held the European super-featherweight title from 1993 to 1995.

He was nicknamed l'Ouragan de Cayenne (The Cayenne Hurricane) for the impressive speed of his hands.

Early life
Yoma was born on 6 October 1966 in Maripasoula, French Guiana, as a member of the Aluku tribe, but settled in the capital city of Cayenne at a young age. At the age of 13 he was diagnosed with a heart murmur and began boxing when he was advised to pick up a sport. He became French amateur champion in 1989 under coach Jacques Chinon and decided to go pro later that year.

Professional career
Yoma made his professional debut on 6 October 1989, defeating Brazilian opponent Geraldo Leite by points in Cayenne. In his fifth bout, he traveled to the United States and fought Regilio Tuur to a majority draw – the first blemish on his record and the first matchup in their trilogy. In the next year, he picked up both the French and WBC FECARBOX super-featherweight titles as he continued to rack up wins. On 14 June 1991 he faced a 37-year-old Daniel Londas for his European super-featherweight title in Reims, and suffered his first career defeat by decisive unanimous decision (UD). Yoma again captured the French and FECARBOX titles before he received another shot at the European crown in Rotterdam on 3 December 1992, falling to Regilio Tuur by way of points in front of a crowd of 7,000 that included John de Wolf and Jules Deelder. Four months later he lost a decision to Guyanese prospect Joseph Murray in Georgetown for the vacant FECARBOX title – his third defeat.

He finally defeated Tuur on 11 June 1993 by split decision in his hometown of Cayenne to become European super-featherweight champion. Over the next two years he successfully defended the European belt on four occasions, with the first three taking place in the hot humidity of Cayenne. His last successful defense was a UD victory over former world champion Jimmi Bredahl in Copenhagen on 7 October 1994. He lost the title on 4 July 1995, suffering a UD defeat in the Paris suburb of Thiais to Russian future world champion Anatoly Alexandrov. Yoma captured the French title once more the following year before retiring in 1999 with a record of 40–11–3.

Professional boxing record

Personal life
Yoma is a member of the Aluku tribe, descendants of the Maroon slaves who fled from the plantations of Dutch Guiana in the eighteenth century.

In 2009, he was handed a six-month suspended prison sentence in a Cayenne courtroom for driving under the influence and causing an accident that injured several people.

In 2015 the Salle de Boxe Jacques Chinon et Jacobin Yoma, named after Yoma and his former coach, was inaugurated in Cayenne.

References

External links
 

Living people
1966 births
Aluku
French Guianan male boxers
French male boxers
People from Maripasoula
Super-featherweight boxers
European Boxing Union champions
Black French sportspeople
Sportspeople from Cayenne